Roel Aarts (born 19 August 1993) is a Dutch retired basketball player. He played for New Heroes Den Bosch, BSW and BAL. In the 2017–18 season, Aarts led the DBL in rebounding.

References

External links
 DBL Profile

1993 births
Living people
Sportspeople from 's-Hertogenbosch
Dutch men's basketball players
Basketball Academie Limburg players
Heroes Den Bosch players
BSW (basketball club) players
Dutch Basketball League players
Centers (basketball)